Sonja Molnar-Palmer (born April 29, 1990) is a Canadian former professional tennis player. She reached a career high WTA singles ranking of 488 on January 6, 2014. She played for the Iowa Hawkeyes from 2009 to 2012 and turned professional after. Molnar played her last match in August 2015 at the Challenger de Gatineau.

Tennis career

2008–12
Molnar made her debut in July 2008 at the ITF $25,000 in Waterloo, reaching the second round in singles and the quarterfinals in doubles. Molnar decided to go to College instead of turning professional in 2009 and was a four-time All-Big Ten performer for the Iowa Hawkeyes until 2012. She was also named Big Ten Freshman of the Year in 2009 and finished her career with 100 singles victories for only 32 losses, the third highest total in program history. She also amassed a 69–44 record in doubles. In August 2012, Molnar was awarded a wildcard to play qualies at the WTA tournament in Montreal, but lost to Mirjana Lučić-Baroni in the first round.

2013
Molnar won her first professional singles title at the beginning of January at the ITF $10,000 in Fort-de-France with a victory over Sherazad Benamar. She also reached a week later her first professional doubles final at the 10K in Saint Martin. In October, Molnar made it to semifinals in doubles of the ITF 25K in Tampico. Molnar reached at the end of October the semifinals in doubles of the ITF $50,000 in Toronto.

2014–15
In mid-January 2014 at the ITF 10K in Saint Martin, Molnar made it to the second professional singles final of her career, but was defeated by Hsu Ching-wen. At the Sumter ITF 10K in May 2014, she reached the second professional doubles final of her career, but lost to Sophie Chang and Andie Daniell.  A week later at the ITF $10,000 in Hilton Head Island, Molnar won her first pro doubles title with a straight sets win over Lauren Albanese and Macall Harkins. At the end of June 2014, Molnar won the second singles title of her career with a victory over Tori Kinard at the ITF 10K in Victoria. In September 2014 at the Coupe Banque Nationale, she was awarded a wildcard in doubles which was her first WTA main draw. She lost in the quarterfinals to Barbora Krejčíková and Tatjana Maria. In late October 2014, Molnar reached her biggest doubles final to date at the ITF 50K in Saguenay where she was eliminated by Ysaline Bonaventure and Nicola Slater. In late January 2015, Molnar reached the doubles final of the ITF 10K in Saint Martin but lost in straight sets to Alexa Guarachi and Ayaka Okuno. In June 2015, she won her third pro singles title after defeating Alexa Graham at the ITF $10,000 in Bethany Beach. She played her last match in August 2015 at the Challenger de Gatineau

ITF Circuit finals

Singles: 4 (3 titles, 1 runner-up)

Doubles: 5 (1 title, 4 runners-up)

Record against top 100 players
Molnar's win–loss record (0–2, 0%) against players who were ranked world No. 100 or higher when played is as follows:
 Madison Keys 0–1
 Mirjana Lučić-Baroni 0–1

References

External links

Iowa Hawkeyes profile

1990 births
Living people
Canadian female tennis players
Racket sportspeople from Ontario
Sportspeople from Brampton